Eucalyptus selachiana is a mallee that is native to a small area in the Gascoyne region of Western Australia.

It blooms between February and April producing simple triad inflorescences with white flowers.

It is found among low open woodlands in the Gascoyne region between Carnarvon and Shark Bay where it grows in sandy calcareous soils.

Eucalyptus selachiana was first formally described in 1998 by Lawrie Johnson and Ken Hill in the journal Telopea, but it is now accepted by the Australian Plant Census as a synonym of the as yet (December 2019) undescribed E. eudesmioides subsp. Selachiana (M.I.H.Brooker 8129).

See also
List of Eucalyptus species

References

Eucalypts of Western Australia
selachiana
Myrtales of Australia
Plants described in 1998
Taxa named by Lawrence Alexander Sidney Johnson
Taxa named by Ken Hill (botanist)